The 1961 Goldsboro B-52 crash was an accident that occurred near Goldsboro, North Carolina, on 23 January 1961. A Boeing B-52 Stratofortress carrying two 3–4-megaton Mark 39 nuclear bombs broke up in mid-air, dropping its nuclear payload in the process. Five crewmen successfully ejected or bailed out of the aircraft and landed safely; another ejected, but did not survive the landing, and two died in the crash. Information declassified in 2013 showed that one of the bombs came close to detonating, with three of the four required triggering mechanisms having activated.

Accident

The aircraft, a B-52G, was based at Seymour Johnson Air Force Base in Goldsboro.  Around midnight on 23–24 January 1961, the bomber had a rendezvous with a tanker for aerial refueling. During the hook-up, the tanker crew advised the B-52 aircraft commander, Major Walter Scott Tulloch (grandfather of actress Elizabeth Tulloch), that his aircraft had a fuel leak in the right wing. The refueling was aborted, and ground control was notified of the problem. The aircraft was directed to assume a holding pattern off the coast until the majority of fuel was consumed. However, when the B-52 reached its assigned position, the pilot reported that the leak had worsened and that  of fuel had been lost in three minutes. The aircraft was immediately directed to return and land at Seymour Johnson Air Force Base.

As the aircraft descended through  on its approach to the airfield, the pilots were no longer able to keep it in stable descent and lost control. Five men landed safely after ejecting or bailing out through a hatch, one did not survive his parachute landing, and two died in the crash. The third pilot of the bomber, Lt. Adam Mattocks, is the only person known to have successfully bailed out of the top hatch of a B-52 without an ejection seat.

Three of the four arming mechanisms on one of the bombs activated after it separated, causing it to execute several of the steps needed to arm itself, such as charging the firing capacitors and deploying a  parachute.

Bomb recovery

Bomb that descended by parachute
The first bomb that descended by parachute was found intact and standing upright as a result of its parachute being caught in a tree. Lt. Jack ReVelle, the explosive ordnance disposal (EOD) officer responsible for disarming and securing the bombs from the crashed aircraft, stated that the arm/safe switch was still in the safe position, although it had completed the rest of the arming sequence. The Pentagon claimed at the time that there was no chance of an explosion and that two arming mechanisms had not activated. A United States Department of Defense spokesperson stated that the bomb was unarmed and could not explode.

Former military analyst Daniel Ellsberg has claimed to have seen highly classified documents indicating that its safe/arm switch was the only one of the six arming devices on the bomb that prevented detonation. In 2013, information released as a result of a Freedom of Information Act request confirmed that a single switch out of four (not six) prevented detonation.

Bomb that fell into a field
Pieces of the bomb were recovered. Although the bomb was partially armed when it left the aircraft, an unclosed high-voltage switch had prevented it from fully arming. In 2013, ReVelle recalled the moment the second bomb's switch was found: Until my death I will never forget hearing my sergeant say, "Lieutenant, we found the arm/safe switch." And I said, "Great." He said, "Not great. It's on arm."

Excavation of the second bomb was eventually abandoned as a result of uncontrollable ground-water flooding. Most of the thermonuclear stage of the bomb was left in place, but the "pit", or core, containing uranium and plutonium which is needed to trigger a nuclear explosion was removed. The United States Army Corps of Engineers purchased a  diameter circular easement over the buried component. The University of North Carolina at Chapel Hill determined the buried depth of the secondary component to be .

Consequences to B-52 design 
Wet wings with integral fuel tanks considerably increased the fuel capacity of B-52G and H models, but were found to be experiencing 60% more stress during flight than did the wings of older models. Wings and other areas susceptible to fatigue were modified in 1964 under Boeing engineering change proposal ECP 1050. This was followed by a fuselage skin and longeron replacement (ECP 1185) in 1966, and the B-52 Stability Augmentation and Flight Control program (ECP 1195) in 1967.

Later analysis of weapons recovery 
Lt. Jack ReVelle, the bomb disposal expert responsible for disarming the device, determined that the ARM/SAFE switch of the bomb which was hanging from a tree was in the SAFE position. The second bomb did have the ARM/SAFE switch in the arm position but was damaged as it fell into a muddy meadow.

In a now-declassified 1969 report, titled "Goldsboro Revisited", written by Parker F. Jones, a supervisor of nuclear safety at Sandia National Laboratories, Jones said that "one simple, dynamo-technology, low voltage switch stood between the United States and a major catastrophe", and concluded that "[t]he MK 39 Mod 2 bomb did not possess adequate safety for the airborne alert role in the B-52", and that it "seems credible" that a short circuit in the arm line during a mid-air breakup of the aircraft "could" have resulted in a nuclear explosion. In contrast the Orange County Register said in 2012 (before the 2013 declassification) that the switch was set to "arm", and that despite decades of debate "No one will ever know" why the bomb failed to explode.

In 2008 and in March 2013 (before the above-mentioned September 2013 declassification), Michael H. Maggelet and James C. Oskins, authors of Broken Arrow: The Declassified History of U.S. Nuclear Weapons Accidents, disputed the claim that a bomb was only one step away from detonation, citing a declassified report. They point out that the arm-ready switch was in the safe position, the high-voltage battery was not activated (which would preclude the charging of the firing circuit and neutron generator necessary for detonation), and the rotary safing switch was destroyed, preventing energisation of the X-Unit (which controlled the firing capacitors). The tritium reservoir used for fusion boosting was also full and had not been injected into the weapon primary. This would have resulted in a significantly reduced primary yield and would not have ignited the weapon's fusion secondary stage.

Legacy

See also
 1964 Savage Mountain B-52 crash
 List of military nuclear accidents
 RAF Lakenheath near nuclear disasters – involved another US military nuclear accident 8 days before the Goldsboro crash
 Special Weapons Emergency Separation System

Explanatory notes

Citations

General and cited references

Further reading

External links
 C-SPAN Video book Goldsboro Brokenarrow
 The Guardian Newspaper  - Account of hydrogen bomb near-disaster over North Carolina – declassified document.
 BBC News Article – US plane in 1961 'nuclear bomb near-miss'
 Last Week Tonight with John Oliver (HBO) show from 2014-07-27 describing the incident
 The Night Hydrogen Bombs Fell over North Carolina
 Simulation illustrating the fallout and blast radius had the bomb actually exploded
 Audio interview with response team leader
 

1961 in military history
1961 in North Carolina
Accidents and incidents involving the Boeing B-52 Stratofortress
Aviation accidents and incidents in North Carolina
Aviation accidents and incidents in the United States in 1961
Aviation accidents and incidents involving nuclear weapons
January 1961 events in the United States
Nuclear accidents and incidents in the United States
Nuclear weapon safety
Wayne County, North Carolina